List of highways in Paraguay, sorted by the official number designation given by the MOPC (Ministry of Public Works and Communications):

Types of Highways 
National routes.
Departmental routes.
Neighborhood roads.
Municipal roads.

List of highways

National Routes
 PY01
 PY02
 PY03
 PY04
 PY05
 PY06
 PY07
 PY08
 PY09
 PY10
 PY11
 PY12
 PY13
 PY14
 PY15
 PY16
 PY17
 PY18
 PY19
 PY20
 PY21
 PY22

Departmental  Routes
D001
D002
D003
D004
D005
D006
D007
D008
D009
D010
D011
D012
D013
D014
D015
D016
D017
D018
D019
D020
D021
D022
D023
D024
D025
D026
D027
D028
D029
D030
D031
D032
D033
D034
D035
D036
D037
D038
D039
D040
D041
D042
D043
D044
D045
D046
D047
D048
D049
D050
D051
D052
D053
D054
D055
D056
D057
D058
D059
D060
D061
D062
D063
D064
D065
D066
D067
D068
D069
D070
D071
D072
D073
D074
D075
D076
D077
D078
D079
D080
D081
D082
D083
D084
D085
D086
D087
D088
D089
D090
D091
D092
D093
D094
D095
D096

References

Roads in Paraguay
Paraguay
Highways
Highways